The Blackhoof River is a  tributary of the North Fork Nemadji River in Carlton County, Minnesota, United States, flowing via the Nemadji River to Lake Superior.

"Black hoof" is the English translation of the native Ojibwe language name.

Course
The Blackhoof's source is near the town of Atkinson, Minnesota.  It flows through Ellston Lake, which is an impoundment of the river.  The Blackhoof River is the largest tributary of the Nemadji River.

Habitat
The Blackhoof River flows through the 4,025.9 acre Blackhoof Wildlife Management Area.  Sections of the Blackhoof River have been designated as trout stream by the Minnesota Department of Natural Resoucrs.  There are both steelhead and brook trout in the Blackhoof River.

See also
List of rivers of Minnesota

References

Rivers of Minnesota
Tributaries of Lake Superior
Rivers of Carlton County, Minnesota
Northern Minnesota trout streams